Ahmet Ünal (born 2 June 1956) is a Turkish cross-country skier. He competed in the men's 30 kilometre event at the 1976 Winter Olympics.

References

1956 births
Living people
Turkish male cross-country skiers
Olympic cross-country skiers of Turkey
Cross-country skiers at the 1976 Winter Olympics
Place of birth missing (living people)
20th-century Turkish people